Devil's Backbone is a rock formation and peninsula formed by the flow of Fourteen Mile Creek into the Ohio River, and is currently situated in Charlestown State Park near Charlestown, Indiana and across the Ohio River from Louisville, Kentucky.  According to local legend, on this bedrock ridge once stood a stone fortress that was built by Welsh explorers led by Prince Madoc sometime in the 12th century.

The Backbone is believed to have been formed by the processes of glaciation where a combination of ice sheet advances, meltwater flows and a diversion of the Ohio River left an isolated bedrock ridge remaining between two valleys.

Rose Island, an amusement park popular during the 1920s that was destroyed by the 1937 Flood, stood on this rugged peninsula, at the base of the ridge on a level area.

Charlestown State Park hiking trails do not provide access to the Backbone, but a loop around the old Rose Island site passes below the ridge.

There is another location by the same name near Fort Ritner, Indiana, east of Bedford.

See also
Geography of Louisville, Kentucky

References

External links
 Satellite image of Devil's Backbone and Rose Island
 Geology Laboratory Manual, Hanover College – includes a more detailed description of how the Backbone probably was formed.

Rock formations of Indiana
Landforms of Clark County, Indiana
Charlestown, Indiana
Peninsulas of Indiana
Glacial erosion landforms